Pearl Mae Bailey (March 29, 1918 – August 17, 1990) was an American actress, singer and author. After appearing in vaudeville, she made her Broadway debut in St. Louis Woman in 1946. She received a Special Tony Award for the title role in the all-black production of Hello, Dolly!  in 1968. In 1986, she won a Daytime Emmy award for her performance as a fairy godmother in the ABC Afterschool Special Cindy Eller: A Modern Fairy Tale. Her rendition of "Takes Two to Tango" hit the top ten in 1952. 

In 1976, she became the first African-American to receive the Screen Actors Guild Life Achievement Award. She received the Presidential Medal of Freedom on October 17, 1988.

Early life 

Bailey was born in Newport News, Virginia to the Reverend Joseph James and Ella Mae Ricks Bailey.  When she was very young, the family moved to Washington, DC. After her parents' divorce, Bailey moved to Philadelphia to live with her mother.

Bailey made her stage-singing debut at the age of 15. Her brother Bill Bailey was beginning his own career as a tap dancer and suggested that she enter an amateur contest at the Pearl Theatre in Philadelphia. Bailey won and was offered $35 a week to perform there for two weeks. However, the theater closed during her engagement and she was not paid. She later won a similar competition at Harlem's famous Apollo Theater and decided to pursue a career in entertainment. She was also known to have performed in the church choir at St Peter Claver Catholic Church in Brooklyn, at the behest of Msgr Bernard J. Quinn.

Career

Bailey began by singing and dancing in Philadelphia's black nightclubs in the 1930s, and soon started performing in other parts of the East Coast. In 1941, during World War II, Bailey toured the country with the USO, performing for American troops. After the tour, she settled in New York. Her solo successes as a nightclub performer were followed by acts with entertainers such as Cab Calloway and Duke Ellington. In 1946, Bailey made her Broadway debut in St. Louis Woman. For her performance, she won a Donaldson Award as the best Broadway newcomer. Bailey continued to tour and record albums along with her stage and screen performances. Early in the television medium, Bailey guest starred on CBS's Faye Emerson's Wonderful Town.

Female impersonator Lynne Carter credited Bailey with launching his career.

In 1967, Bailey and Cab Calloway headlined an all-black cast version of Hello, Dolly! The touring version was so successful that producer David Merrick took it to Broadway, where it played to sold-out houses and revitalized the long-running musical. Bailey was given a special Tony Award for her role, and RCA Victor released a second original-cast album, the only recording of the score to have an overture written especially for the recording.

A passionate fan of the New York Mets, Bailey sang the national anthem at Shea Stadium prior to Game 5 of the 1969 World Series, and appears in the World Series highlight film showing her support for the team. She also sang the national anthem prior to Game 1 of the 1981 World Series between the New York Yankees and Los Angeles Dodgers at Yankee Stadium.

Bailey hosted her own variety series on ABC, The Pearl Bailey Show (January – May 1971), which featured many notable guests, including Lucille Ball, Bing Crosby and Louis Armstrong (one of his last appearances before his death).

Following her 1971 television series, she provided voices for animations such as Tubby the Tuba (1976) and Disney's The Fox and the Hound (1981). She returned to Broadway in 1975, playing the lead in an all-black production of Hello, Dolly!. In October 1975, she was invited by Betty Ford to sing for Egyptian president Anwar Sadat at a White House state dinner as part of Mideast peace initiative.

She earned a degree in theology from Georgetown University in Washington, D.C. in 1985 at age 67. It took her seven years to earn her degree. At Georgetown, she was a student of the philosopher Wilfrid Desan.

Later in her career, Bailey was a fixture as a spokesperson in a series of Duncan Hines commercials, singing "Bill Bailey (Won't You Come Home)." She also appeared in commercials for Jell-O, Westinghouse and Paramount Chicken.

In her later years, Bailey wrote several books: The Raw Pearl (1968), Talking to Myself (1971), Pearl's Kitchen (1973) and Hurry Up America and Spit (1976). In 1975, she was appointed special ambassador to the United Nations by President Gerald Ford, a position she held under three presidents. Her last book, Between You and Me (1989), details her experiences with higher education. On January 19, 1985, she appeared on a nationally televised broadcast gala the night before the second inauguration of Ronald Reagan. In 1988, Bailey received the Presidential Medal of Freedom from President Reagan.

Personal life
Bailey went through a number of failed marriages in her earlier adult years. She married John Randolph Pinkett, either her third or fourth husband, when she was 30 years old, and divorced him four years later, accusing him of physical abuse.

On November 19, 1952, Bailey married jazz drummer Louie Bellson in London. They remained married until her death nearly 38 years later in 1990. Bellson was six years Bailey's junior and white. Interracial couples were rare at that time, and Bellson's father was reportedly opposed to the marriage because of Bailey's race.         

They later adopted a son, Tony, in the mid-1950s. A daughter, Dee Dee J. Bellson, was born April 20, 1960. Tony Bellson died in 2004. Dee Dee Bellson died on July 4, 2009, at the age of 49, five months after her father, who died on February 14.

Bailey, a Republican, was appointed by President Richard Nixon as the nation's "Ambassador of Love" in 1970. She attended several meetings of the United Nations and later appeared in a campaign ad for President Gerald Ford in the 1976 election.

She was awarded the Bronze Medallion in 1968, the highest award conferred upon civilians by New York City.

Bailey was a close friend of actress Joan Crawford. In 1969, Crawford and Bailey joined fellow friend Gypsy Rose Lee in accepting a USO award. That same year, Bailey was recognized as USO's woman of the year. Upon Crawford's death in May 1977, Bailey spoke of Crawford as her sister and sang a hymn at her funeral. American socialite Perle Mesta was another of Bailey's close friends. In the waning days of Mesta's life, Bailey visited Mesta frequently and sang hymns for her.

Death
Bailey died at Thomas Jefferson University Hospital in Philadelphia on August 17, 1990. An autopsy confirmed the death was caused by the narrowing of the coronary artery.  Bailey had suffered from heart problems for over thirty years.

Bailey is buried at Rolling Green Memorial Park in West Chester, Pennsylvania.

Remembrances
The television show American Dad! features Pearl Bailey High School.

The 1969 song "We Got More Soul" by Dyke and the Blazers includes Bailey in its roster of icons.

A dress owned by Bailey is at the National Museum of African American History and Culture.

A library in her hometown of Newport News, Virginia is named after her.

Performances

Film
Variety Girl (1947) – Pearl Bailey – Singer
Isn't It Romantic? (1948) – Addie
Carmen Jones (1954) – Frankie
That Certain Feeling (1956) – Augusta aka Gussie
St. Louis Blues (1958) – Aunt Hagar
Porgy and Bess (1959) – Maria
All the Fine Young Cannibals (1960) – Ruby
The Landlord (1970) – Marge
Tubby the Tuba (1975) – Mrs. Elephant (voice)
Norman... Is That You? (1976) – Beatrice Chambers
The Fox and the Hound (1981) – Big Mama – Owl (voice)

Television
The Pat Boone Chevy Showroom (prior to 1960) – Herself
The Andy Williams Show (1963) – Herself
The Ed Sullivan Show (1968) – Guest Star
Mike and Pearl (1968) – Herself
Carol Channing and Pearl Bailey: On Broadway (1969) – Herself
The Pearl Bailey Show (1971) (midseason replacement series) – Herself – Host / Singer
The Carol Burnett Show (1972) – Guest Star
 One More Time (1974), a CBS musical comedy specialwith Carol Channing, George Burns and others – Herself
The Love Boat (1977) – Millie Washington
All-Star Salute to Pearl Bailey (1979) – Herself
The Muppet Show (1979) – Herself
The Member of the Wedding (1982) – Bernice Sadie Brown
As the World Turns (cast member in 1982) – Herself
Peter Gunn (1989) (unsold pilot) – Mother (final television appearance)

Theater
St. Louis Woman (1946) (Broadway)
Arms and the Girl (1950) (Broadway)
Bless You All (1950) (Broadway)
House of Flowers (1954) (Broadway)
Les Poupées de Paris (1962) (Off-Broadway) (voice only)
Call Me Madam (1966) (Melodyland Theater)
Hello, Dolly! (1967)  (Broadway and US national tour)
Hello, Dolly! (1975) (Broadway)

Discography

 Pearl Bailey Entertains (1950) and 1953
 Birth of the Blues (1952)
 Cultured Pearl (1952)
 I'm with You (1953)
 Say Si Si (1953)
 Around the World with Me (1954)
 Carmelina (1955)
 The Intoxicating Pearl Bailey (1956)
 The One and Only Pearl Bailey Sings (1956)
 Gems by Pearl Bailey (1958)
 Porgy & Bess, original motion picture soundtrack (1959) (Grammy Award winner)
 Pearl Bailey A-Broad (1959)
 Pearl Bailey Sings for Adults Only (1959)
 Pearl Bailey Plus Margie Anderson Singing the Blues (1960?)
 More Songs for Adults Only (1960)
 For Adult Listening (1960)
 Naughty but Nice (1960)
 Songs of the Bad Old Days (1960)
 Pearl Bailey Sings the Songs of Harold Arlen (1961)
 Come On, Let's Play with Pearlie Mae (1962)
 Happy Sounds (1962)
 All About Good Little Girls and Bad Little Boys (1963)
 C'est La Vie (1963)
 Les Poupées de Paris (1964)
 Songs By James Van Heusen (1964)
 The Risque World of Pearl Bailey (1964)
 For Women Only (1965)
 The Jazz Singer (1965)
 Hello, Dolly! (1967 Broadway cast)
 After Hours (1969)
 Pearl's Pearls (1971)

Bibliography

The Raw Pearl (1968) (autobiography)
Talking to Myself (1971) (autobiography)
Pearl's Kitchen: An Extraordinary Cookbook (1973)
Duey's Tale (1975) (Photos and Design by Arnold Skolnick)
Hurry Up America and Spit (1976)
Between You and Me: A Heartfelt Memoir on Learning, Loving, and Living (1989)

See also
 It takes two to tango

References

External links

Pearl Bailey at TVGuide.com

Pearl Bailey Collection, 1944-1989 at the Library of Congress
Pearl Bailey papers from African American Museum in Philadelphia

African-American actresses
20th-century African-American women singers
African-American television personalities
1918 births
1990 deaths
Presidential Medal of Freedom recipients
Special Tony Award recipients
American film actresses
American cookbook writers
20th-century American memoirists
American women memoirists
American musical theatre actresses
American stage actresses
American voice actresses
Black conservatism in the United States
Vaudeville performers
Daytime Emmy Award winners
Donaldson Award winners
Screen Actors Guild Life Achievement Award
Georgetown College (Georgetown University) alumni
Mercury Records artists
Roulette Records artists
RCA Victor artists
Pennsylvania Republicans
Virginia Republicans
People from Southampton County, Virginia
Musicians from Newport News, Virginia
Singers from Virginia
20th-century American actresses
20th-century American singers
20th-century American women singers
20th-century American women writers
African-American Catholics